Little Cressingham lies  south east by road from Great Cressingham,  west of Watton and  south of Swaffham in the Breckland District of Norfolk. The village is located on the edge of the Stanford Battle Area.

The villages name origin is uncertain but probably means 'Homestead/village of Cressa's people', or perhaps, 'cress homestead/village'.

The village is dispersed, with the main centre focused on a crossroads around the church and the mill. The village church is dedicated to St Andrew and is partially ruined. The building is medieval and designated as a Grade I listed building. The village is in the Benefice of Cockley Cley.

The village pub, The White Horse, closed in 2004. Next to the church is the old Free School founded and endowed by William Farrer in 1809 and built at a cost of £144. It is now the village hall. The mill at Little Cressingham, a Grade II* listed building, is both a water and wind mill, one of only two in Norfolk. It was built in about 1820 on the Clermont Estate and is now disused.

Clermont estate
The Clermont Estate in Threxton, hamlet near Little Cressingham, was created by the Irish peer William Henry Fortescue (1722–1806), Earl of Clermont, friend of the Prince of Wales. He built Clermont Lodge as a shooting box and it was extended for his nephew and heir William Charles Fortescue (1764–1829), Viscount Clermont to designs by the architect William Pilkington. Pilkington was a pupil and assistant to Sir Robert Taylor (architect of the Bank of England).

Following Viscount Clermont's death without issue Clermont Estate was sold to Sir Francis Lyttleton Holyoake Goodricke in 1844 and in 1858 it was purchased by the 2nd Duke of Wellington. In 1863 he conveyed the Hilborough and Clermont Estates to John Remington Mills. In 1869 Mills bought the Watton estate and an outlying farm at Tottenhill in Norfolk. His son Joseph Trueman Mills added the South Pickenham estate, Norfolk.

The last owner of Clermont Hall was Sir Richard Prince-Smith who acquired the estate in 1966 and sold it in 1997. Much of it is now owned by the UK Ministry of Defence.

Clermont House was built in 1971/2 in the walled garden of Clermont Hall as a replacement for Clermont Hall and as an agent's house. John Davies, Prince-Smith's resident land agent from 1971—1997, bought Clermont House in 1977. Davies added to the house in later years and in 1983 developed an arboretum extending  which is open to public visitors. In 1972 Clermont Hall was found to be riddled with dry rot but attempts to demolish were thwarted by the imposition of a preservation order.

Footnotes

References

http://kepn.nottingham.ac.uk/map/place/Norfolk/Great%20and%20Little%20Cressingham

Villages in Norfolk
Breckland District
Civil parishes in Norfolk